Ceroplesis blairi is a species of beetle in the family Cerambycidae. It was described by Breuning in 1937. It is known from Sierra Leone and Cameroon.

References

blairi
Beetles described in 1937